Fengwei is a town in the Quangang District of Quanzhou City, Fujian, China.  It is situated on a peninsula in Meizhou Bay, jutting southeast toward the bay's entrance.

The town oversees eight villages:

 Chengfeng Village
 Chengping Village
 Qianting Village
 Zhengrong Village
 Guocuo Village()
 Shanglou Village
 Lianyan Village
 Village

References

Quanzhou